Arthur John Masaracchia (December 20, 1950 – January 12, 2015), better known as A. J. Masters was an American country music singer. He charted eight singles on Hot Country Songs between 1985 and 1987, also writing singles for John Berry, Faith Hill, and Jennifer Hanson.

Biography
Masters was born in Walden, New York but raised in Compton, California. He played bass guitar in his brother's band, and had his first cut in 1978 when Mickey Jones recorded "I'm No Cowboy".

Masters signed with Bermuda Dunes records in the 1980s, charting with eight of his releases for the label. The highest peak was number 48 with "Back Home", his second release, in early 1986. He also released an album of the same name in 1986. An uncredited review in Billboard gave Back Home a positive review, saying that Masters had "a light, intense, and flexible quality". A review of "I Don't Mean Maybe", his fourth single, praised his "full and assertive voice."

Masters received an Academy of Country Music nomination for Male Vocalist of the Year. In the 1990s, Masters played guitar for Charlie Rich and wrote the songs "Change My Mind", which was recorded by both The Oak Ridge Boys and John Berry, "Someday" and "Moo La Moo" by Steve Azar, "Last Request" by Frazier River, "Love Ain't Like That" by Faith Hill, and "Half a Heart Tattoo" by Jennifer Hanson. He died on January 12, 2015, of prostate cancer.

Discography

AB-side to "255 Harbor Drive".

References

American country singer-songwriters
American male singer-songwriters
2015 deaths
Musicians from Compton, California
People from Walden, New York
1950 births
Singer-songwriters from California
Country musicians from California
Country musicians from New York (state)
Singer-songwriters from New York (state)